Sporostigena is a genus of moths in the family Lasiocampidae. The genus was erected by George Thomas Bethune-Baker in 1904.

Species
Sporostigena ninayi Bethune-Baker, 1916
Sporostigena trilineata Joicey & Talbot, 1916
Sporostigena uniformis Bethune-Baker, 1904

References

Lasiocampidae